Isaac Henry may refer to:
 Isaac Henry (cricketer)
 Isaac Henry (rugby union)